Angrabari or Amreshwar Dham located near Khunti, Jharkhand, is a Hindu temple complex dedicated to the Hindu deity Shiva. The temple is built and maintained by Amreshvar Dham Prabandh Samiti. It was renamed as Amreshwar Dham by the Sage Shankaracharya Swami Swarupananda Saraswati.

The temple site also houses several other Hindu deities including Ganesha, Rama, Sita and Hanuman. There is a large crowd of Shiva devotees here during the month of Sawan and on the day of Maha Shivaratri.

References

External links
Khunti district official website: Angrabari Shiv Temple
Khunti district official website: Notification of reconstruction of Amreshwar Dham

Hindu temples in Jharkhand